Liverpool Township, Ohio, may refer to:
Liverpool Township, Columbiana County, Ohio
Liverpool Township, Medina County, Ohio

See also
East Liverpool, Ohio, a city in Columbiana County

Ohio township disambiguation pages